Amphimallon is a genus of beetles of the family Scarabaeidae.

Species

Amphimallon altaicum
Amphimallon arianae
Amphimallon assimile
Amphimallon atrum
Amphimallon bruckii
Amphimallon burmeisteri
Amphimallon cantabricum
Amphimallon evorense
Amphimallon furvum
Amphimallon fuscum
Amphimallon gianfranceschii
Amphimallon javeti
Amphimallon jeannei
Amphimallon jenrichi
Amphimallon keithi
Amphimallon krali
Amphimallon lusitanicum
Amphimallon maevae
Amphimallon majale – European chafer
Amphimallon maniense
Amphimallon menori
Amphimallon naceyroi
Amphimallon nigripenne
Amphimallon nigrum
Amphimallon occidentale
Amphimallon ochraceum
Amphimallon peropacum
Amphimallon pini
Amphimallon pseudomajale
Amphimallon pygiale
Amphimallon roris
Amphimallon ruficorne
Amphimallon sainzi
Amphimallon seidlitzi
Amphimallon solstitiale – summer chafer, European June beetle
Amphimallon spartanum
Amphimallon verticale
Amphimallon vitalei
Amphimallon vivesi
Amphimallon volgense

References

 
Scarabaeidae genera